Arvydas Romas Sabonis (born December 19, 1964) is a Lithuanian former professional basketball player and businessman. Recognized as one of the best European players of all time, he won the Euroscar six times and the Mr. Europa Award twice. He played in a variety of leagues, including the Spanish ACB League, and spent seven seasons in the National Basketball Association (NBA). Playing the center position, Sabonis won a gold medal at the 1988 Summer Olympics, in South Korea, for the Soviet Union, and later earned bronze medals at the 1992 Olympic Games and 1996 Olympic Games representing Lithuania. He retired from professional basketball in 2005. Sabonis was selected by the Portland Trail Blazers in the first round of the 1986 NBA draft, but he did not play his first NBA game until 1995, at the age of 30.

Sabonis is considered one of the best big man passers, as well as one of the best overall centers, in the history of the game. Bill Walton once called Sabonis "a  Larry Bird" due to his unique court vision, shooting range, rugged in-game mentality, and versatility.

On August 20, 2010, Sabonis was inducted into the FIBA Hall of Fame, in recognition of his great play in international competition. On April 4, 2011, Sabonis was named to the Naismith Memorial Basketball Hall of Fame, and he was as a player, inducted on August 12, 2011. At that time, he was the tallest player to ever enter the Naismith Memorial Basketball Hall of Fame; one year later, he would be surpassed by  Ralph Sampson. On October 24, 2011, Sabonis was voted as the next President of the Lithuanian Basketball Federation, replacing Vladas Garastas, who had led the LBF since 1991. He resigned from the position on October 2, 2013, but came back to it on October 10, 2013.

His son, Domantas Sabonis, plays for the NBA's Sacramento Kings .

Early life and career
Born in Kaunas, in then Lithuanian SSR, Soviet Union, Sabonis began playing basketball at age 13. By the time he was 15 years old, he was a member of the Soviet national junior team.

Sabonis was excused from mandatory service to the Soviet Army, by enrolling at the Lithuanian University of Agriculture, in his hometown.

Professional career

Žalgiris
Sabonis made his professional club debut in 1981, with one of the oldest basketball teams in Lithuania, Žalgiris, in his hometown of Kaunas. With the club, he won three consecutive Soviet Premier League titles, and the 1986 FIBA Club World Cup (FIBA Intercontinental Cup).

Valladolid
In 1989, Sabonis left Žalgiris, and signed with the Spanish Liga ACB club Fórum Valladolid. During the 1991–92 season, Sabonis helped the team to reach the semifinals at the Korać Cup.

Real Madrid
In 1992, after playing with Fórum Valladolid for three seasons, Sabonis joined the Spanish club Real Madrid, and with them, he won two Spanish League titles, and a FIBA European League (EuroLeague) title, in 1994–95. With Real Madrid, during the 1994–95 Spanish League season, he averaged 22.9 points, 12.5 rebounds, 2.4 assists, 1.6 steals, and 2.3 blocked shots, in 42 games played. While in the 1994–95 FIBA European League season, he averaged 21.8 points, 11.2 rebounds, 2.6 assists, and 1.8 steals per game, in 17 games played.

Portland Trail Blazers
Sabonis was originally selected by the Atlanta Hawks, with the 77th overall pick, of the 1985 NBA draft. However, the selection was voided, because Sabonis was under 21 at the time of the draft. The following spring, he suffered a devastating Achilles' tendon injury. Nevertheless, he was selected by the Portland Trail Blazers, with the 24th overall pick of the 1986 NBA draft. Sabonis was not allowed to play in the US by the Soviet authorities, despite LSU Tigers head coach Dale Brown's plans to have Sabonis studying and playing at Louisiana State University, and thus keeping him in an amateur status. However, he did go to Portland, to rehabilitate his injury with the Blazers medical staff, in 1988, while also practicing with the team.

After the 1994–95 European season, Sabonis and Portland contacted one another about a move to the NBA. Before signing Sabonis, Portland's then-general manager, Bob Whitsitt, asked the Blazers team physician to look at Sabonis' X-rays. Illustrating the impact of Sabonis' numerous injuries, Whitsitt recalled in a 2011 interview, that when the doctor reported the results, "He said that Arvydas could qualify for a handicapped parking spot, based on the X-ray alone." Nevertheless, the Blazers signed Sabonis. He had a successful rookie campaign, averaging 14.5 points, on 55% shooting, and 8.1 rebounds per game while playing less than 24 minutes per game. Sabonis was selected to the All-Rookie First Team, and was runner-up in both Rookie of the Year and Sixth Man of the Year voting. His postseason averages went up to 23.6 points and 10.2 rebounds per game. In the first playoff series of his NBA career, Portland lost to Utah, in five games. Sabonis averaged 16.0 points, 10.0 rebounds, and 3.0 assists per game, in 1997–98, all career-highs.

During Sabonis' first leg in Portland, the Blazers always made the playoffs (part of a 21-year streak); between 1998 and 1999, the Oregon franchise changed large parts of its roster, in order to compete for the NBA Championship (after six consecutive first round losses), with center Sabonis the only player remaining in the starting five. Kenny Anderson and Isaiah Rider were traded for Damon Stoudamire and Steve Smith. In both those years, the Blazers reached the Western Conference Finals; in 1999 they were swept by the eventual champions, the San Antonio Spurs, while the next year, the team (starting Sabonis, Smith, Stoudamire, Rasheed Wallace, and recently added Scottie Pippen) lost to the Los Angeles Lakers (at the beginning of the team's three-peat), in seven games.

The question that frequently surrounds Sabonis' NBA career revolves around how good he could have been, had he played in the NBA during his prime. Sabonis was already 30 when he joined the Blazers, by which time he had already won multiple gold medals, suffered through numerous injuries, and had lost much of his mobility and athleticism. In Bill Simmons' "Book of Basketball", Sabonis the international player is idealized, while Sabonis the Blazer, is described as "lumbering up and down the court in what looked to be concrete Nikes", and ranking "just behind Artis Gilmore on the Moving Like a Mummy Scale." In ESPN's David Thorpe's view, Sabonis would be the best passing big man in NBA history, and possibly a top four center overall, had he played his entire career there. In Clyde Drexler's view, if Sabonis had been able to spend his prime in Portland, next to the plethora of other Trail Blazers' All Stars (Drexler, Terry Porter, Buck Williams, Steve Johnson, Kevin Duckworth, and Clifford Robinson), the Trail Blazers would "have had four, five or six titles. Guaranteed. He was that good. He could pass, shoot three pointers, had a great post game, and dominated the paint."

On April 6, 2001, Sabonis scored a season-high 32 points while making 11 of 12 field goal attempts, during a 122-91 win over the Golden State Warriors. After the 2000–2001 NBA season, Sabonis refused to sign an extension with the Trail Blazers and retired from the NBA. In his own words, he "was tired mentally and physically." Instead, he returned to Europe, where he signed a one-year deal, at a nominal salary, with Žalgiris Kaunas, expecting to join the team for the most important games of the season down the stretch. However, he ended up missing that season in its entirety, resting and recovering from injuries. Sabonis rejoined the Trail Blazers for one final season, in 2002–2003.

He won the Euroscar twice, while playing with the Blazers. He also became a fan favorite, and had a warm welcome back when he visited Portland in 2011, en route to being enshrined into the Naismith Hall of Fame.

Back to Žalgiris
Sabonis came back to Žalgiris to play his final season, in 2003–04. He led the team to the Top 16 stage of the EuroLeague that year, and was named the Regular Season MVP and the Top 16 MVP. He also became the team's President. Sabonis would officially retire from playing professional basketball, in 2005.

National team career

Soviet national team

In 1982, Sabonis was one of the players in the senior Soviet Union national team that toured the United States, playing against various college basketball teams.

Despite being recommended to rest, instead of playing in the 1988 Summer Olympics, the Soviets allowed Sabonis to remain a part of their national team. Sabonis led the Soviet Union to a gold medal, with a win against the 1988 edition of the United States national team, that featured future NBA All-Stars David Robinson, Mitch Richmond, and Danny Manning in the semifinals. This was the last American Olympic team that was not composed of active NBA players. The team later beat Yugoslavia in the finals.

In his career with the senior Soviet national team, Sabonis also played at the following major tournaments: the 1982 FIBA World Championship (gold medal), the 1983 EuroBasket (bronze medal), the 1985 EuroBasket (gold medal), the 1986 FIBA World Championship (silver medal), and the 1989 EuroBasket (bronze medal). He was named to the EuroBasket All-Tournament Team in 1983 and 1985, and he was named the EuroBasket MVP in 1985.

The 1985–1988 stretch of a heavy playing schedule, and lack of rest, took a significant toll on Sabonis' future health and durability. Various leg injuries were not given much time to heal, due to the Cold War climate that surrounded international competition, as well as the intense rivalry of the Žalgiris Kaunas versus CSKA Moscow games in the USSR Premier League. In a 2011 interview, Sabonis expressed an opinion, that overuse by the coaches of the Soviet national program, was a major contributing factor to his first Achilles' tendon injury, back in 1986. Another key moment for his future health, took place in 1988, when Sabonis had a surgical Achilles procedure performed in Portland, but was rushed back on the floor with the USSR Olympic team, before a full recovery. The decision to include a limping Sabonis, on the USSR roster for the 1988 Olympic Games, was protested at the time by the Portland medical staff, and was later heavily criticized. While the Soviets cleared him to play professionally in 1989, when his Soviet national teammate, Šarūnas Marčiulionis, went to North America, Sabonis postponed his travel, over feeling that he was not physically ready for the NBA. Eventually, Sabonis would develop chronic knee, ankle and groin issues, that substantially limited his mobility and explosiveness, by the mid-1990s.

Lithuanian national team
After breakup of the Soviet Union, and the independence of Lithuania, Sabonis then became a member of the senior Lithuanian national team. He represented Lithuania at the following major tournaments: the 1992 Summer Olympic Games (bronze medal), the 1995 EuroBasket (silver medal), the 1996 Summer Olympic Games (bronze medal), and the 1999 EuroBasket. He was named to the EuroBasket All-Tournament Team in 1995.

Sabonis was also awarded a silver medal at the 2013 EuroBasket tournament, due to being the Lithuanian Basketball Federation (LKF) President.

Career statistics

NBA

Regular season

|-
| style="text-align:left;"|
| style="text-align:left;"|Portland
| 73 || 21 || 23.8 || .545 || .375 || .757 || 8.1 || 1.8 || .9 || 1.1 || 14.5
|-
| style="text-align:left;"|
| style="text-align:left;"|Portland
| 69 || 68 || 25.5 || .498 || .371 || .777 || 7.9 || 2.1 || .9 || 1.2 || 13.4
|-
| style="text-align:left;"|
| style="text-align:left;"|Portland
| 73 || 73 || 32.0 || .493 || .261 || .798 || 10.0 || 3.0 || .9 || 1.1 || 16.0
|-
| style="text-align:left;"|
| style="text-align:left;"|Portland
| 50 || 48 || 27.0 || .485 || .292 || .771 || 7.9 || 2.4 || .7 || 1.3 || 12.1
|-
| style="text-align:left;"|
| style="text-align:left;"|Portland
| 66 || 61 || 25.6 || .505 || .368 || .843 || 7.8 || 1.8 || .7 || 1.2 || 11.8
|-
| style="text-align:left;"|
| style="text-align:left;"|Portland
| 61 || 42 || 21.3 || .479 || .067 || .776 || 5.4 || 1.5 || .7 || 1.0 || 10.1
|-
| style="text-align:left;"|
| style="text-align:left;"|Portland
| 78 || 1 || 15.5 || .476 || .500 || .787 || 4.3 || 1.8 || .8 || .6 || 6.1
|- class="sortbottom"
| style="text-align:center;" colspan="2"|Career
| 470 || 314 || 24.2 || .500 || .328 || .786 || 7.3 || 2.1 || .8 || 1.1 || 12.0

Playoffs

|-
| style="text-align:left;"|1996
| style="text-align:left;"|Portland
| 5 || 5 || 35.4 || .432 || .556 || .717 || 10.2 || 1.8 || .8 || .6 || 23.6
|-
| style="text-align:left;"|1997
| style="text-align:left;"|Portland
| 4 || 4 || 27.0 || .429 || .250 || .875 || 6.5 || 2.3 || .8 || .8 || 11.3
|-
| style="text-align:left;"|1998
| style="text-align:left;"|Portland
| 4 || 4 || 26.8 || .450 || .500 || .857 || 7.8 || 1.5 || 1.8 || .8 || 12.3
|-
| style="text-align:left;"|1999
| style="text-align:left;"|Portland
| 13 || 13 || 30.2 || .398 || .200 || .907 || 8.8 || 2.2 || 1.2 || 1.2 || 10.0
|-
| style="text-align:left;"|2000
| style="text-align:left;"|Portland
| 16 || 16 || 30.8 || .453 || .286 || .796 || 6.7 || 1.9 || .9 || .8 || 11.3
|-
| style="text-align:left;"|2001
| style="text-align:left;"|Portland
| 3 || 3 || 34.7 || .483 || .000 || .750 || 8.3 || 2.7 || .3 || 2.3 || 11.3
|-
| style="text-align:left;"|2003
| style="text-align:left;"|Portland
| 6 || 1 || 14.3 || .667 ||  || .800 || 4.0 || .8 || .7 || .7 || 10.0
|- class="sortbottom"
| style="text-align:center;" colspan="2"|Career
| 51 || 46 || 28.8 || .452 || .319 || .802 || 7.4 || 1.9 || .9 || .9 || 12.1

EuroLeague

|-
| style="text-align:left;"|1985–86
| style="text-align:left;"|Žalgiris
| 13 ||  ||  ||  ||  ||  ||  ||  ||  ||  || 24.5 || 
|-
| style="text-align:left;"|1986–87
| style="text-align:left;"|Žalgiris
| 6 ||  ||  ||  ||  ||  ||  ||  ||  ||  || 21.3 || 
|-
| style="text-align:left;"|1992–93
| style="text-align:left;"|Real Madrid
| 20 ||  || 30.9 || .543 || .500 || .663 || style="background:#cfecec;"|12.0* || 1.9 || 1.2 ||  || 16.5 || 
|-
| style="text-align:left;"|1993–94
| style="text-align:left;"|Real Madrid
| 15 ||  || 34.3 || .577 || .350 || .723 || 11.9 || 2.9 || 1.0 ||  || 17.4 || 
|-
| style="text-align:left; background:#afe6ba;"|1994–95†
| style="text-align:left;"|Real Madrid
| 17 ||  || 33.8 || .572 || .545 || .783 || 11.2 || 2.6 || 1.8 ||  || 21.8 || 
|-
| style="text-align:left;"|2003–04
| style="text-align:left;"|Žalgiris
| 18 || 14 || 28.3 || .560 || .366 || .696 || style="background:#cfecec;"|10.7* || 2.4 || 1.0 || style="background:#cfecec;"|1.6* || 16.7 || style="background:#cfecec;"|26.3*
|- class="sortbottom"
| style="text-align:center;" colspan="2"|Career
| 89 ||  || 31.6 || .562 || .439 || .716 || 11.4 || 2.4 || 1.3 || 1.6 || 19.2 ||

Personal life
Sabonis is married to Ingrida Mikelionytė, the first Miss Lithuania, a fashion model, and a movie actress. They have a daughter named Aušrinė, and three sons: Žygimantas, Tautvydas, and Domantas – the last two being born in the cities their father was playing, Valladolid and Portland. Once Sabonis left the NBA, the family moved to the Spanish coastal city of Málaga. Domantas was drafted 11th overall in the 2016 NBA draft and is currently a three-time NBA All-Star, and currently plays for the Sacramento Kings. Žygimantas, and Tautvydas decided to continue their careers in Europe. Both Domantas and Tautvydas played for the Lithuania national team in different levels of competition.

In September 2011, Sabonis suffered a heart attack, while playing basketball in Lithuania. Doctors said that the heart attack was not life-threatening.

According to his son, Domantas, Arvydas is a huge fan of the Boston Celtics, his favorite basketball player is Larry Bird and his favorite color is green.

Popular culture
He appeared on the Lithuanian cover of the video game NBA Live 2001.

Arvydas Sabonis' basketball career and journey to represent his native country Lithuania in the 1992 Barcelona Olympics is highlighted in the documentary film The Other Dream Team. The film premiered at the Sundance Film Festival in 2012 and was distributed by Lionsgate in the U.S. and Disney internationally.

See also
 List of tallest players in National Basketball Association history
 List of European basketball players in the United States

References

External links

FIBA Archive Profile
InterBasket Profile
Euroleague.net Profile
FIBAEurope.com Profile
Spanish ACB Profile 

1964 births
Living people
1982 FIBA World Championship players
1986 FIBA World Championship players
Atlanta Hawks draft picks
Basketball players at the 1988 Summer Olympics
Basketball players at the 1992 Summer Olympics
Basketball players at the 1996 Summer Olympics
Basketball players from Kaunas
BC Žalgiris players
Businesspeople from Kaunas
CB Valladolid players
Centers (basketball)
Euroscar award winners
FIBA EuroBasket-winning players
FIBA Hall of Fame inductees
FIBA World Championship-winning players
Honoured Masters of Sport of the USSR
Liga ACB players
Lithuanian expatriate basketball people in the United States
Lithuanian expatriate basketball people in Spain
Lithuanian men's basketball players
Lithuanian Sportsperson of the Year winners
Medalists at the 1988 Summer Olympics
Medalists at the 1992 Summer Olympics
Medalists at the 1996 Summer Olympics
Naismith Memorial Basketball Hall of Fame inductees
National Basketball Association players from Lithuania
Olympic basketball players of Lithuania
Olympic basketball players of the Soviet Union
Olympic bronze medalists for Lithuania
Olympic gold medalists for the Soviet Union
Olympic medalists in basketball
Portland Trail Blazers draft picks
Portland Trail Blazers players
Real Madrid Baloncesto players
Recipients of the Olympic Order
Recipients of the Order of Friendship of Peoples
Recipients of the Order of the Lithuanian Grand Duke Gediminas
Soviet expatriate sportspeople in Spain
Soviet men's basketball players
Vytautas Magnus University Agriculture Academy alumni